Prince Charles Bretagne Marie de La Trémoille (24 March 1764 – 10 November 1839), 8th Duke of Thouars, 7th Duke of La Trémoïlle, 10th prince de Tarente, 14th prince de Talmond and 14th Count of Laval, was a French aristocrat and soldier; he was the son of Jean Bretagne Charles de La Trémoille and his wife Princess Marie-Maximilienne of Salm-Kyrburg.

Marriages
La Trémoille married Louise-Emmanuelle de Châtillon in 1781. She was a grand daughter of Louis César de La Baume Le Blanc, the famous writer. The couple had one daughter:

Caroline (26 October 1788 – 15 February 1791).

At the outbreak of the French Revolution, he sided with King Louis XVI, as did the rest of his family.  In 1789, La Trémoille and his parents emigrated from France, and he joined the émigré army under the Prince of Condé.  Two of La Trémoille's brothers perished in the Reign of Terror.  His wife was imprisoned in the prison de l'Abbaye until 1792, when she was permitted to join him in England.  She became a writer and left England in company of her brother-in-law Marie François Emmanuel de Crussol for the court of Russia around March 1797, where she was a maid of honour of Empress Maria Feodorovna.

After the Revolution, La Trémoille returned to France.  Following Louise-Emmanuelle's death, he remarried in 1817 to Marie Virginie de Saint-Didier.  They had two daughters: 
Charlotte (8 October 1825 – 21 December 1879), who married baron Franciscus Johannes de Wijkerslooth. 
Éléonore (17 January 1827 – 26 November 1846), who married prince Frederick V, Prince of Salm-Kyrburg.

Following her death, La Trémoille married for a third time in 1830 to Valentine Eugénie Joséphine Walsh de Serrant (7 March 1810 – 10 September 1887).  They had two children:
Marie-Henriette (1833–1890), who married André de Grandmange.
Louis Charles, (1838–1911) his heir as duc of Thouars.
La Trémoille died shortly after his son's birth, in 1839.

Ancestry

References

External links

1764 births
1839 deaths
Nobility from Paris
House of La Trémoille
French princes
Dukes of Thouars
Dukes of La Trémoille
Counts of France
18th-century French nobility
19th-century French nobility
People of Byzantine descent